Mazus reptans, common name creeping mazus, is a low-growing perennial plant native to the Himalayas region of Asia.

Description
Mazus reptans is a herbaceous plant with alternate, simple leaves, on creeping and rooting stems.

The purple-blue to white flowers are borne in spring and summer. The flower crown is 2-lipped and violet-blue to pink or white, inside with white and yellow spots. The period of bloom lasts from Spring through Summer.

The capsule fruits contain small seeds.

Cultivation
Mazus reptans is cultivated as an ornamental plant, for use as a groundcover in gardens and container gardening.  Creeping mazus can quickly form a dense ground-hugging carpet of bright green foliage, with showy seasonal flowers.  It's fingernail sized lance-shaped toothed leaves typically remain green throughout the growing season, and it is evergreen in hardiness zones 5–8. It spreads quickly due to the stems rooting.

It prefers protected full sun to half-shade locations.

Creeping mazus is used in smaller open areas, between stepping stones in paths and patios, a trailing plant in pots, and in flower beds.

It can also be used as a beneficial ground cover for grape vines (Vitis spp.), or the spring foliage of bulbs.

References

 Gordon Cheers (Ed.): "Botanica"; Random House Australia; 2003. German issue: Tandem publishing company Ltd in 2003, .

reptans
Flora of the Indian subcontinent
Garden plants of Asia
Groundcovers
Plants described in 1914